This is a list of notable software calculators.

Immediate execution calculators (button-oriented)

Expression or formula calculators (command-line oriented)

See also
 Software calculator
 Calculator input methods
 Formula calculator
 Calculator
 Graphing calculator
 Scientific calculator

Software calculators
Comparisons of mathematical software